Fuente Encalada is a municipality located in the province of Zamora, Castile and León, Spain. At the 2009 census (INE) the municipality had a population of 125 inhabitants.

References

Municipalities of the Province of Zamora